The men's 50 kilometre cross-country skiing competition at the 1980 Winter Olympics in Lake Placid, United States, was held on Saturday 23 February at Mount Van Hoevenberg, Essex County, New York. Sven-Åke Lundbäck of Sweden was the 1978 World champion and Ivar Formo of Norway was the defending champion from the 1976 Olympics in Innsbruck, Austria.

Each skier started at half a minute intervals, skiing the entire 50 kilometre course. Of the 43 athletes who started the race, 6 did not finish. Nikolay Zimyatov of the Soviet Union took his third Gold medal of the games after winning the 30 kilometre and being part of Soviet Union's winning 4 × 10 km relay team.

Results
Sources:

References

External links
 Final results (International Ski Federation)

Men's cross-country skiing at the 1980 Winter Olympics
Men's 50 kilometre cross-country skiing at the Winter Olympics